The Gakkel Ridge Caldera, also known as Gakkel Caldera, is a Pleistocene volcanic caldera located on the Gakkel Ridge beneath the Arctic Ocean, off the northern coast of Siberia. This eruption places it at VEI-8 on the Volcanic Explosivity Index, making it one of the most explosive volcanoes on Earth during the Pleistocene along with Yellowstone Caldera and Lake Toba. It is the only known supervolcano located directly on the mid-ocean ridge.

References 

Pleistocene calderas
Submarine calderas
Supervolcanoes
VEI-8 volcanoes
Volcanoes of the Arctic Ocean